The FIL European Luge Championships 1939 took place in Reichenberg, Czechoslovakia (then under control of Nazi Germany, now Liberec, Czech Republic) for the second time under the auspices of the Fédération Internationale de Bobsleigh et de Tobogganing (FIBT - International Bobsleigh and Tobogganing Federation in ) under their "Section de Luge", a trend that would continue until the International Luge Federation (FIL) was formed in 1957. Reichenberg hosted the first European championships in 1914. It would also mark the last time these championships would be held prior to the outbreak of World War II later that year.

Men's singles

Preissler ended Tietze's reign of four straight championships in this event. Between 1928 and 1939, both men combined for seven championships victories in this event.

Women's singles

Men's doubles

Medal table

References
FIL-Luge.org list of European luge champions  - Accessed January 31, 2008.
Men's doubles European champions
Men's singles European champions
Women's singles European champions

FIL European Luge Championships
1939 in luge
Sport in Czechoslovakia
1939 in Czechoslovak sport